Emerald Peak is a  mountain summit located west of the crest of the Sierra Nevada mountain range, in Fresno County of central California, United States. Other nearby peaks include The Hermit,  to the east, and Peter Peak,  to the southeast. The John Muir Trail passes to the northeast, providing an approach.

History
The peak's descriptive name was originally applied in 1895 as "Emerald Point" by Sierra Club explorer Theodore Solomons due to its color, caused by greenish slate. This geographical feature's name has been officially adopted by the United States Board on Geographic Names. The first ascent of the summit was made August 8, 1925, by Sierra Club members Norman Clyde, Julie Mortimer, and Eleanor Bartlett.

Climate
According to the Köppen climate classification system, Emerald Peak is located in an alpine climate zone. Most weather fronts originate in the Pacific Ocean, and travel east toward the Sierra Nevada mountains. As fronts approach, they are forced upward by the peaks, causing them to drop their moisture in the form of rain or snowfall onto the range (orographic lift). Precipitation runoff from this mountain drains into tributaries of the San Joaquin River.

See also

 List of mountain peaks of California

References

External links

 Weather forecast: Emerald Peak

Mountains of Fresno County, California
Mountains of Kings Canyon National Park
North American 3000 m summits
Mountains of Northern California
Sierra Nevada (United States)